Macedonist may refer to:

 an adherent supporter of modern Macedonism
 an early Macedonian nationalist from the late 19th century
 a linguist, who is an expert of Macedonian studies

See also 
 Macedonianist (disambiguation)
 Ancient Macedonist